Moordrecht is a town and a former municipality in the province of South Holland, the Netherlands, situated along the river Hollandse IJssel.

In September 2006, 93% of the population of Moordrecht chose by referendum to pursue a merger with the neighboring municipalities Nieuwerkerk aan den IJssel and Zevenhuizen-Moerkapelle. Only 7% chose to merge with Gouda. Based on this result, the town council decided to form the new municipality Zuidplas in 2010 with Nieuwerkerk aan den IJssel and Zevenhuizen-Moerkapelle.

International footballer Memphis Depay was born there.

References

External links

Official website

Municipalities of the Netherlands disestablished in 2010
Former municipalities of South Holland
Populated places in South Holland
Zuidplas